Aaron Joseph Looper (born September 7, 1976) is a former Major League Baseball relief pitcher. He pitched in the Seattle Mariners farm system from 1998 to 2006. In 2003, Looper appeared in six games with the Mariners' major league team. He also played one game for the independent New Jersey Jackals of the Can-Am League in 2007. Looper is currently a baseball scout for the St. Louis Cardinals organization. He is the cousin of former MLB pitcher Braden Looper.

References

External links

1976 births
Living people
Seattle Mariners players
St. Louis Cardinals scouts
Baseball players from Oklahoma
Major League Baseball pitchers
Everett AquaSox players
Wisconsin Timber Rattlers players
Lancaster JetHawks players
San Bernardino Stampede players
Tacoma Rainiers players
Inland Empire 66ers of San Bernardino players
New Jersey Jackals players
People from Ada, Oklahoma